The Mediterranean Sea is a major body of water south of Europe, west of Asia and north of Africa.

Mediterranean may also refer to:

Geography
 Mediterranean sea (oceanography), an oceanographic term to designate a mostly enclosed sea that has limited exchange of deep water with outer oceans
 Mediterranean Basin, the European, Asian, and African land areas surrounding the Mediterranean Sea
 Mediterranean climate, a type of climate that resembles the weather in the Mediterranean basin
 Mediterranean Europe, those European countries that have a Mediterranean coastline
 Mediterranean forests, woodlands, and scrub, an ecoregion found in various parts of the world, named for the Mediterranean basin
 A list of Mediterranean countries

Politics and military
 Mediterranean States, the two countries of Cyprus and Malta
 Union for the Mediterranean, a political partnership of European, African and Middle Eastern countries
 Mediterranean Dialogue, a forum of cooperation between NATO and seven countries of the Mediterranean
 Mediterranean Theater of Operations, a major theatre of World War II
 Mediterranean pass, a document which identified a ship as being protected under a treaty with states of the Barbary Coast
 Méditerranée, the name of a historical department of the First French Empire in present-day Italy

Other uses
 "The Mediterranean" (La Méditerranée), a historical work by Fernand Braudel
 Ansa Mediterranean, an Italian news agency
 Mediterranean League, a football league played in Spain during the Spanish Civil War
 Mediterranean diet, a modern nutritional recommendation inspired by traditional dietary patterns of Greece, Southern Italy, Spain and Portugal
 Mediterranean cuisine, the food from the cultures adjacent to the Mediterranean Sea
 Mediterranean race, a historical racial classification
 Familial Mediterranean fever, a hereditary inflammatory disorder
 Mediterranean University, a university located in Podgorica, Montenegro

See also
 British Mediterranean Airways, an airline in the United Kingdom
 Mediterranean Ridge, a wide ridge in the bed of the Mediterranean Sea
 Mediterranean noir, a literary style in fiction
 Mediterranean Revival architecture, a design style during the 20th century
 Classical antiquity
 Mediterranea (film), a 2015 film
 Mediterranean Universities Union, an association of universities based in the Mediterranean basin
 Mediterranean Grand Prix, a motor race held in Sicily from 1962 until 1998
 Mediterranean Games, a multi-sport games held every four years
 Mediterranean Harbor, one of the Tokyo Disney Sea's themed areas
 List of Mediterranean fleets
 Mediterranean Squadron (disambiguation)
 Mediterranean Shearwater (disambiguation)